Cyclopteropsis mcalpini, also known as the Arctic lumpsucker, is a species of lumpfish known only from the Arctic Ocean. It has been found in the Barents Sea and off the coast of northwestern Greenland, where it occurs at a depth range of 109 to 329 m (358 to 1079 ft). It is a small fish, growing to 7.5 cm (3 inches) in total length. Arctic lumpsuckers are reported to usually lay between 60 and 70 eggs (each with a diameter of 5 mm), which are deposited in protected areas such as empty shells.

References 

mcalpini
Fish described in 1914
Fish of Greenland
Fish of the Arctic Ocean
Taxa named by Henry Weed Fowler